Freske fraspark (Fresh Push-Offs) is a Norwegian comedy film from 1963 directed by Bjørn Breigutu. The script was written by Kjell Aukrust and Breigutu. The story was previously arranged for stage for the Norwegian Theater in Oslo as the play Dobbeltsats og freske fraspark (Double Takeoff and Fresh Push-Offs), which was based on scenes from Aukrust's books Simen and Bror min, published in 1958 and 1960.

Filming of Freske fraspark took place in Alvdal, Tolga, and Vingelen. The film was very poorly received by the reviewer at Verdens Gang, who gave it one star out of six.

Plot
An old village dispute between Alvdal and Tynset has flared up again in the winter of 1936. The reason is that Per Sætermyrmoen has won the Holmenkollen 50 km cross-country ski race, and both villages would like to claim him as one of their own and celebrate the skier upon his return home.

Cast
 Henki Kolstad as Embret Trondsbakken
 Einar Vaage as the father-in-law
 Birger Løvaas as Martin
 Alf Malland as Ollvar
 Frank Robert as Jostein
 Ragnhild Michelsen as Oline, Embret's wife
 Turid Balke as Martin's wife
 Elsa Lystad as Ollvar's wife
 Kari Diesen as Jostein's wife
 Carsten Byhring as the editor
 Leif Juster as Torgrim Skarpjordet
 Svein Byhring one of the Alvdal residents

References

External links
 
 Freske fraspark at the National Library of Norway

1963 films
Norwegian comedy films
Norwegian black-and-white films
Films set in Norway
1963 comedy films